The 1989 Pacific Tigers football team represented the University of the Pacific (UOP) in the 1989 NCAA Division I-A football season as a member of the Big West Conference.

The team was led by head coach Walt Harris, in his first year, and played home games at Stagg Memorial Stadium in Stockton, California. They finished the season with a record of two wins and ten losses (2–10, 2–5 Big West). The Tigers were not competitive in many of their games in 1989, being outscored by their opponents 179–406 over the season. In their 10 losses, that's an average score of 14–37.

Schedule

Team players in the NFL
No UOP players were selected in the 1990 NFL Draft.

The following finished their college career in 1989, were not drafted, but played in the NFL.

References

Pacific
Pacific Tigers football seasons
Pacific Tigers football